Zadar County is a county in Croatia, it encompasses northern Dalmatia and southeastern Lika. Its seat is the city of Zadar.

Geography

Among the largest towns in the county of Zadar are: Zadar, Benkovac, Bibinje, Biograd, Nin, Obrovac and Pag.

The county of Zadar includes the islands of Dugi otok, Ugljan, Pašman, Molat, Lavdara, Zverinac, Vir and most of Pag, as well as a number of other, smaller islands. It also features the Paklenica national park.

The county's area is 7,854 km2, 3,646 km2 is land, which accounts for 6.4% of the territory of Croatia. The sea area of the county is 3,632 km2 (around 12% of the territorial waters) and the insular area is 580 km2, with more than 300 smaller and larger islands (Zadar Archipelago). The length of its coastline (including the islands) is 1,300 km.

Administrative division

Zadar County is divided into:

 City
 Zadar
 Towns
 Benkovac
 Biograd na Moru
 Nin
 Obrovac
 Pag
 Municipalities
 Bibinje
 Galovac
 Gračac
 Jasenice
 Kali
 Kolan
 Kukljica
 Lišane Ostrovičke
 Novigrad
 Pakoštane
 Pašman
 Polača
 Poličnik
 Posedarje
 Povljana
 Preko
 Privlaka
 Ražanac
 Sali
 Stankovci
 Starigrad
 Sukošan
 Sveti Filip i Jakov
 Škabrnja
 Tkon
 Vir
 Vrsi
 Zemunik Donji

County government

See organization of Croatian counties.

, the Župan is Božidar Longin of the Croatian Democratic Union (HDZ), and the county assembly's 42 representatives are affiliated as follows:
 Croatian Democratic Union: 15
 Social Democratic Party of Croatia (SDP): 8
 Croatian Party of Rights dr. Ante Starčević: 5
 Akcija mladih: 3
 Lista grupe birača: 2
 Croatian Party of Pensioners (HSU): 2
 Croatian Peasants Party (HSS): 1
 Croatian Social Liberal Party (HSLS): 1
 Croatian Party of Rights (HSP): 1
 Democratic Party of Pensioners (DSU): 1
 Croatian Pure Party of Rights (HČSP): 1
 Croatian Labourists – Labour Party: 1
 Independent: 1

Demographics 

According to the 2011 census, Zadar County has population of 170,017, accounting for 4.0% of the total Croatia's population. Croats make up the majority with 92.57% of the population, while Serbs, Bosniaks, Albanians and Italians form the remainder.

Infrastructure

The County of Zadar plays a leading role in road and railway traffic links between northern and southern Croatia.

The Adriatic Highway, the main road along the Adriatic Sea passes through the county, as does the A1 motorway, completed as far as Split in 2005. The Zagreb-Knin-Split railway line with branch-lines to Zadar and Šibenik pass through the county.

Maritime traffic is carried by the coastal route of the Adriatic Sea, by the Zadar-Ancona international car ferry route which is the shortest link between Central Europe and Italy, via Zagreb and Zadar to Rome and southward. Another route by which intensive traffic is carried is Zadar - Maslenica Bridge - St. Rok Tunnel - Zagreb.

The Zadar Airport has recently been reconstructed and modernised. With runway improvements still to be undertaken it will eventually have the capacity to handle jumbo-jets.

There is also a very frequent maritime passenger port in the town of Zadar and the cargo maritime port in the Gaženica area whose current manipulative capacity amounts to one million tonnes per year. A construction of a wharf would raise this significantly. The port's manipulative and warehouse capacities are used only in part.

Economy

The Ravni Kotari area constitutes the greater part of the county's inland, containing most of the cultivated farmland and towns having industry, crafts, trade and traffic development potential.

Tourism is one of the county's most important industries, owing to its geographical position, mild climate, indented coast, clear sea, numerous bays, inlets and beaches on 1,300 km of the sea coast and islands. Tourist amenities of the Zadar County are also the areas of outstanding natural beauty: the Velebit, Telaščica and Paklenica and adjacent Krka and Kornati national parks in the south and the Plitvice Lakes national park in the north.

References

External links
 Official site of Zadar County
 Zadar tourist information
 Zadar Maps - Info Zadar

 
Counties of Croatia
Dalmatia